Aboimov is a Russian surname. Notable people with the surname include:

Ivan Aboimov (born 1936), Russian diplomat
Viktor Aboimov (born 1949), Kazakhstani swimmer

Russian-language surnames